John Joseph O'Brien (July 13, 1866 – May 13, 1913) was a Canadian professional baseball player. He played second base in Major League Baseball between 1891 and 1899.

External links

1866 births
1913 deaths
19th-century baseball players
Canadian expatriate baseball players in the United States
Major League Baseball second basemen
Brooklyn Grooms players
Chicago Colts players
Louisville Colonels players
Washington Senators (1891–1899) players
Baltimore Orioles (NL) players
Pittsburgh Pirates players
San Francisco Haverlys players
Portland (minor league baseball) players
Oakland Colonels players
Lewiston (minor league baseball) players
Augusta Electricians players
Dover (minor league baseball) players
Buffalo Bisons (minor league) players
Nashville Tigers players
Providence Clamdiggers (baseball) players
Providence Grays (minor league) players
Montreal Royals players
Syracuse Stars (minor league baseball) players
Scranton Miners players
Elmira Pioneers players
Oswego Pioneers players
Major League Baseball players from Canada
Canadian baseball players
Canadian sportspeople of Irish descent
Baseball people from New Brunswick
Sportspeople from Saint John, New Brunswick